Sara Giménez (born 4 September 1996) is a Paraguayan former professional tennis player.

Born in Asuncion, Giménez was a women's doubles gold medalist at the 2013 Bolivarian Games (with Verónica Cepede Royg) and also represented Paraguay at the 2014 South American Games. 

In 2015 she made a solitary Fed Cup appearance for Paraguay in a doubles rubber against Venezuela, which she and partner Camila Giangreco Campiz won in straight sets.

Competing on the professional tour until 2017, she attained a career high singles world ranking of 719 during her career, while in doubles she had a best ranking of 510 and won two ITF titles.

ITF finals

Doubles: 5 (2–3)

References

External links
 
 
 

1996 births
Living people
Paraguayan female tennis players
Competitors at the 2014 South American Games
South American Games competitors for Paraguay
Sportspeople from Asunción
21st-century Paraguayan women